Bryodelphax is a genus of tardigrades in the family Echiniscidae. The genus was first described by Gustav Thulin in 1928.

Species
The genus includes the following species:
 Bryodelphax aaseae Kristensen, Michalczyk & Kaczmarek, 2010
 Bryodelphax alzirae (du Bois-Reymond Marcus, 1944)
 Bryodelphax amphoterus (Durante Pasa & Maucci, 1975)
 Bryodelphax arenosus Gąsiorek, 2018
 Bryodelphax asiaticus Kaczmarek & Michalczyk, 2004
 Bryodelphax atlantis Fontoura, Pilato & Lisi, 2008
 Bryodelphax brevidentatus Kaczmarek, Michalczyk & Degma, 2005
 Bryodelphax crossotus Grigarick, Schuster & Nelson, 1983
 Bryodelphax dominicanus (Schuster & Toftner, 1982)
 Bryodelphax instabilis Gąsiorek & Degma, 2018
 Bryodelphax iohannis Bertolani, Guidi & Rebecchi, 1996
 Bryodelphax kristenseni Lisi, Daza, Londoño & Quiroga, 2017
 Bryodelphax lijiangensis Yang, 2002
 Bryodelphax maculatus Gąsiorek, Stec, Morek, Marnissi & Michalczyk, 2017
 Bryodelphax mateusi (Fontoura, 1982)
 Bryodelphax meronensis Pilato, Lisi & Binda, 2010
 Bryodelphax olszanowskii Kaczmarek, Parnikoza, Gawlak, Esefeld, Peter, Kozeretska & Roszkowska, 2017
 Bryodelphax ortholineatus (Bartoš, 1963)
 Bryodelphax parvulus Thulin, 1928
 Bryodelphax parvuspolaris Kaczmarek, Zawierucha, Smykla & Michalczyk, 2012
 Bryodelphax sinensis (Pilato, 1974)
 Bryodelphax tatrensis (Węglarska, 1959)
 Bryodelphax weglarskae (Pilato, 1972)

References

Further reading
 Thulin, 1928 : Über die Phylogenie und das System der Tardigraden. [On the Phylogeny and the System of Tardigrades] Hereditas, vol. 11, no 2/3, p. 207-266.
 Nomenclator Zoologicus info

Echiniscidae
Tardigrade genera